Mayuri Wagh is a Marathi television and film actress. She is known for her performances in Asmita and in Ti Phulrani.

Career
Mayuri  is originally from the town of Dombivali near Mumbai. She started her career as a side dancer and theater artist.  Mayuri Wagh debuted in Marathi television with the serial Vachan Dile Tu Mala Star Pravah. Later she played the role "Detective Asmita" in the popular Zee Marathi crime-based series Asmita. Apart from serials, Wagh has also appeared in television adverts such as Glow & Lovely, Tupperware, Harpic, Dabur Chyawanprash and Magnum Ice Cream. She has also appeared in reality shows such as Housefull, and Sugaran & Mejwani Paripoorna Kitchen.==

Personal life
Mayuri Wagh completed her education from Kelkar College in Mumbai, followed by a post graduation in HR from Wellingkar college.

Filmography

Television

Film
Manyaa-The Wonder Boy

Theater
 Sohala Gosht Premachi
 Mangalyach Lena

References

External links
 Mayuri Wagh on IMDb

1988 births
Living people
Actresses in Marathi cinema
Actresses in Marathi television